Mahesh Bhupathi and Max Mirnyi were the defending champions, but played this tournament with different partners. Bhupathi teamed up with Todd Woodbridge while Mirnyi teamed up with Jonas Björkman. Both pairs were eliminated in semifinals.

Michaël Llodra and Fabrice Santoro won the title, defeating Bob and Mike Bryan 6–4, 6–2 in the final.

Seeds
All seeds received a bye into the second round.

Draw

Finals

Top half

Bottom half

External links
 Main Draw

Men's Doubles
Italian Open - Doubles